The 1978 United States Senate election in Texas was held on November 7, 1978. Incumbent Republican U.S. Senator John Tower narrowly won re-election to a fourth term. This is the closest that a Texas Democrat has come to defeating a Republican incumbent U.S. Senator.

Republican primary

Candidates
 John G. Tower, incumbent U.S. Senator since 1961

Results
Senator Tower was unopposed for re-nomination.

Democratic primary

Candidates
 Joe Christie, former State Senator from El Paso (1967–73)
 Bob Krueger, U.S. Representative from New Braunfels since 1975

Campaign 
Krueger and Christie had contrasting styles, and many voters were undecided until late in the campaign.

Results

General election

Campaign 
Krueger held a narrow lead in the polls late in the race, although the race was considered to be a 'toss-up.' On the issues, Tower attacked Krueger for voting for a constitutional amendment that would have granted U.S. senators to the District of Columbia, while Krueger attacked Tower for being an ineffective representative and a drunk. As a result of the charge, Tower refused to shake Krueger's hand at a joint appearance.

Results
Republicans celebrated the result in this election year as the 'best in a century' despite the narrow win. One analysis in the New York Times cites the growing urban middle-class voters in Houston who migrated from the Northeast as the reason for Tower being able to pull ahead and win.

See also 
 1978 United States Senate elections

References 

Texas
1978
1978 Texas elections